King's Highway 406 (pronounced "four-oh-six"), commonly referred to as Highway 406, is a 400-series highway in the Canadian province of Ontario. The primary north-south route through the central portion of the Niagara Peninsula, Highway 406 connects Welland, Thorold and downtown St. Catharines to the Queen Elizabeth Way (QEW).

Construction of Highway 406 began in 1963. The first section opened between St. Davids Road and Geneva Street on December 7, 1965, followed by a southward extension to Beaverdams Road in late 1969. The route was later extended south as a super two to Merritt Road where it became Highway 58. In 1977, construction began to connect the freeway with the QEW; this was completed in late 1984. Construction on the route resumed in 1987, connecting the route with East Main Street in Welland, completed in 1995.
In 2009 construction resumed on the highway to expand the remaining two-lane sections to a four-lane divided freeway, with the existing route becoming the southbound lanes of the new freeway. The southern terminus in Welland was converted to a roundabout while the remaining at-grade intersections were rebuilt as interchanges.

Route description 
From 1987 until 2015, Highway 406 was unique as the only 400-series highway with two lane sections and with an at-grade rail crossing. The highway is heavily travelled within St. Catharines, but volumes drop considerably south of the city. It is patrolled by the Ontario Provincial Police.

The 406 designation begins at East Main Street in Welland at a roundabout immediately west of East Main Street Tunnel beneath the Welland Canal. From here the now-four-lane divided road veers northeast and travels parallel to the canal. Two golf courses separate the canal. As the highway passes to the west of them, it jogs to the west and crosses a Trillium Railway spur (formerly at-grade, now over the railway), and meets Daimler Parkway and Woodlawn Road at a newly constructed interchange. Soon after, it crosses the Welland River and then the former channel of the canal, which was replaced by the current Welland By-Pass in the 1970s.

The highway curves to the northwest as it passes through thick forest, and meets another newly built interchange with Merritt Road (formerly Highway 58), which as of 2009 was being rebuilt as a grade-separated interchange.
After this, it returns to its northward orientation and passes the final former at-grade intersection, Niagara Regional Road 63 (Port Robinson Road).

North of Port Robinson Road, the forests break and the freeway continues straight north for  through a mostly agricultural area. Along the straightaway are interchanges with former Highway 20 and Niagara Regional Road 67 (Beaverdams Road). The freeway crosses over Lake Gibson, and curves to the northeast. It passes beneath Niagara Regional Road 71 (St. Davids Road) and Highway 58 at a complicated interchange as it descends the Niagara Escarpment, a UNESCO Biosphere Reserve, and enters St. Catharines.

Within St. Catharines, Highway 406 twists frequently, entering the Twelve Mile Creek valley south of a complicated interchange with Westchester Avenue and Geneva Street and curving west.
It passes beneath the high-level St. Paul Street bridge, crosses the creek and intersects Fourth Avenue.

History 
Planning for Highway 406 began in early 1959, when Minister of Highways Fred M. Cass presented the Ontario Roads and Streets report to the Ontario Legislative Assembly on March 16, outlining highways needs for the province over 20 years. One of the planned routes was a freeway to link Highway 3 in Port Colborne with the QEW, travelling alongside the Welland Canal. By 1961, route studies and planning were well underway.
The future route was designated as Highway 406 despite construction not beginning until 1963;
the first section, between Geneva Street and St. Davids Road, opened December 7, 1965. This was followed several years later by an extension south to Beaverdams Road, which opened November 21, 1969.
During the early 1970s, the highway was extended south as a Super 2 to north of the Welland River, where it curved west along Merritt Road and became Highway 58.
This extension, which included the Beaverdams Road interchange and a signalized intersection, was opened on June 30, 1971.

In 1977, construction began on the section of Highway 406 between Geneva Street and the QEW.
This work included the construction of several large bridges over the widened ravine, a curving structure over Twelve Mile Creek, and the first single-point urban interchange (SPUI) in Ontario (the only other SPUI is located on Airport Parkway in Ottawa). The original design plans for Highway 406 called for this section to follow the creek valley the full distance to the QEW, interchanging with it east of Martindale Road. Instead, the alignment was moved west of the city. Realignments to several streets in St. Catharines were completed in advance of construction on overpasses, ramps and the bridges over Twelve Mile Creek; this work was finished in late 1983.
Grading contracts were awarded in mid-1983 for the entire extension. Paving took place during the summer of 1984, and the route was opened to traffic in October 1984.

Further work to extend the future southbound lanes Highway 406 to East Main Street in Welland began during the fall of 1987, including an eastward extension of Woodlawn Road. Construction of the bridges that carry the extension over the Welland River and old canal began in mid-1988, and was completed during the fall of 1989. Work then began to grade and pave the Woodlawn Road Extension to Highway 406 and Highway 406 between there and East Main Street.
The extension was completed by the mid-1990s.

Expansion 

Highway 406 was the last 400-series highway that featured at-grade intersections and two lane sections.
The original intention was to twin this two-lane section shortly after it was constructed in the 1970s. Plans were deferred multiple times, until the project resumed in the early 2000s.
The first phase of this twinning opened to traffic in 2007, extending the four-lane highway  from its previous convergence south of Beaverdams Road to a point north of Port Robinson Road.

On May 15 2009, Minister of Transportation Jim Bradley announced that the section from Port Robinson road to East Main Street in Welland would be converted to a full freeway;
this work included a roundabout at East Main Street to replace the existing signalized intersection.
Work on the Merritt Road overpass began in September 2009, and was scheduled for completion in mid-2011.
On August 19, 2011, full construction began with a groundbreaking ceremony.
The roundabout with East Main Street opened to traffic on September 5, 2013, featuring no central island. By September 2015, all the at-grade intersections had been removed and the 406 was a minimum four-lane, controlled-access freeway for its entire length.
Despite requests from local politicians, there are no plans to extend Highway 406 to Port Colborne at this time.

Exit list

References

External links 

Highway 406 images @ AsphaltPlanet.ca
Highway 406 expansion
Video of Highway 406 northbound, showcasing the roundabout in Welland
Highway 406 live traffic cameras

06
Roads in the Regional Municipality of Niagara
Thorold
Transport in St. Catharines
Transport in Welland